The 2014–15 Women's FIH Hockey World League Round 2 was held from February to March 2015. A total of 24 teams competing in 3 events took part in this round of the tournament playing for 7 berths in the Semifinals, to be played in June and July 2015.

Qualification
8 teams ranked between 12th and 19th in the FIH World Rankings current at the time of seeking entries for the competition qualified automatically, but Belgium and Spain were chosen to host a Semifinal therefore exempt from Round 2. Scotland would have qualified as the nineteenth ranked team but will compete as Great Britain as in every Olympic Qualifying Tournament, giving its berth to twentieth ranked Russia. Additionally 17 teams qualified from Round 1, including Turkey and Ghana who replaced the Czech Republic and Fiji after they withdrew from participating, and one nation that did not meet ranking criteria and was exempt from Round 1 that hosted a Round 2 tournament. The following 24 teams, shown with final pre-tournament rankings, will compete in this round of the tournament.

Montevideo
Montevideo, Uruguay, 14–22 February 2015.

All times are Uruguay Summer Time (UTC−02:00)

First round

Pool A

Pool B

Second round

Quarterfinals

Fifth to eighth place classification

Crossover

Seventh and eighth place

Fifth and sixth place

First to fourth place classification

Semifinals

Third and fourth place

Final

Awards
Player of the Tournament: 
Top Scorer:  (7 goals)
Young Player of the Tournament: 
Goalkeeper of the Tournament:

New Delhi
New Delhi, India, 7–15 March 2015.

All times are Indian Standard Time (UTC+05:30)

First round

Pool A

Pool B

Second round

Quarterfinals

Fifth to eighth place classification

Crossover

Seventh and eighth place

Fifth and sixth place

First to fourth place classification

Semifinals

Third and fourth place

Final

Awards
Player of the Tournament: 
Top Scorer:  (11 goals)
Young Player of the Tournament: 
Goalkeeper of the Tournament:

Dublin
Dublin, Ireland, 14–22 March 2015.

All times are Greenwich Mean Time (UTC±00:00)

First round

Pool A

Pool B

Second round

Quarterfinals

Fifth to eighth place classification

Crossover

Seventh and eighth place

Fifth and sixth place

First to fourth place classification

Semifinals

Third and fourth place

Final

Awards
Player of the Tournament:  Megan Frazer
Top Scorer:  (9 goals)
Young Player of the Tournament: 
Goalkeeper of the Tournament:

References

External links
Official website (Montevideo)
Official website (New Delhi)
Official website (Dublin)

Round 2
International women's field hockey competitions hosted by Uruguay
International women's field hockey competitions hosted by India
International women's field hockey competitions hosted by Ireland
Hockey
Hockey
Hockey